Sofana R. Dahlan (سفانة ربيع دحلان) is an accomplished Saudi lawyer and social entrepreneur. She holds the prized distinction of being among the first three female lawyers to have been granted the permit to practice law in Saudi Arabia  and has served as a legal consultant in different parts of the Arab world including Saudi Arabia, Lebanon, and Kuwait. Dahlan was also the Vice Governor for Entrepreneurship Advancement at the Small and Medium Enterprises Authority of Saudi Arabia from 2016 to 2017, making her the first Saudi female senior economic policymaker. Most recently she has enrolled at King's College, London in order to pursue a PhD in Culture Media and Creative Industries specialising in: The Obstacles Facing the Development of Creative Industries in Saudi Arabia: A Deep Dive into Intellectual Property Infringement and its Implications.

Early life and education
Sofana R. Dahlan was born to the Al Dahlan (آل دحلان) family of Makkah. Her mother, Huda Kayal, was an academic specialising in English Literature at King Abdulaziz University in Jeddah and her father, Dr. Rabea S. Dahlan, served as Deputy Governor of the Emirate of Makkah from 1989 until 1999.

She has completed an undergraduate degree in Law (LLB) from Cairo University, a postgraduate degree in Islamic Law from the Higher Institute of Islamic Studies in Egypt along with an MBA degree from the American University of Technology. In 2009, she was involved in the Harvard Executive program "Leading for the Future: The Arab Region in a Changing World" and has also obtained an executive degree in Global Leadership & Public Policy from Harvard University in 2013.

Career
Dahlan is the founder of many social enterprises that focus on developing the creative industries in the region. She is the founder of Tashkeil, a Saudi-based social enterprise that incubates, accelerates and promotes creative entrepreneurs. She is also the founder of Kayan Space and Studios – a membership-based environment for creative professionals, entrepreneurs and freelancers.

In 2013, Dahlan initiated, the Saudi National Creative Initiative (SNCI) which is a collaborative creative knowledge transfer platform that was established in 2013. Stimulated profoundly by Dahlan's passion for working with youth and the Saudi Vision 2030, SNCI aims to map and understand the Saudi Creative Industry in order to reinforce creativity and utilize the youth to unleash its full potential and drive Saudi Arabia to a knowledge-based economy.

Philanthropy
Dahlan is regarded as an icon for female empowerment for her advocacy to advocate cultural, heritage and socially oriented issues. She is an active member of the Board of Directors at Khadija Bint Khuwailid Centre, a businesswoman and lobbying center at the Jeddah Chamber of Commerce and Industry. She has spoken at public platforms such as Pecha Kucha in Beirut, Beirut Design Week, TEDxWomen in Barcelona, and BOLDtalks Woman  and has penned numerous articles on topics such as women's rights, social values, and inter-religious dialogue.

Notable accolades
 In 2011, she was chosen to participate at the Harvard Executive program - 'Leading for the Future: The Arab Region in a Changing World' where she represented her founding company, Tashkeil, socioeconomic cycle as an ecosystem for social change and development.
 In 2011, she became the first Saudi to serve as a fellow of the United Nations Alliance of Civilizations (UNAOC) on a tour of Europe and the U.S.
 In 2014, she was the recipient of the "Most Innovative Woman Entrepreneur" for WIL Achievement Awards.
 In 2015, she was recognised as WEF Young Global Leader.
 In 2015, she was the recipient of "Female Entrepreneur of the Year" for Arab Women Awards.
 In 2015, she received a Silver Stevies Award for "Female Entrepreneur of the Year (in MENA and Europe)" whilst under her direction, Tashkeil received a Bronze Stevies Award for the "Most Innovative Company of the Year" category. She was also recognised as "Female Entrepreneur of the Year" by Arab Women Awards.
 In 2018, she was the recipient of "Leadership Excellence in Social Entrepreneurship" for the 8th Global Leadership Awards.

References

21st-century Saudi Arabian lawyers
Saudi Arabian activists
Cairo University alumni
American University of Technology alumni
Living people
Saudi Arabian women lawyers
Year of birth missing (living people)